The Santa Marta antpitta (Grallaria bangsi) is a species of bird in the family Grallariidae. It is endemic to Colombia. Its natural habitat is subtropical or tropical moist montane forest. It is threatened by habitat loss.

Description
The Santa Marta antpitta is 18 cm long and is brown above with eye ring. Its underparts are white streaked brown, except for bright buff throat, brownish flanks and cinnamon buff underwing coverts.

See also
Outram Bangs

References

External links
 BirdLife Species Factsheet

Santa Marta antpitta
Birds of the Sierra Nevada de Santa Marta
Endemic birds of Colombia
Santa Marta antpitta
Taxonomy articles created by Polbot